François Albert-Buisson (3 May 1881, Issoire, Puy-de-Dôme – 21 May 1961, Aix-en-Provence) was a French entrepreneur, industrial, consular magistrate, economist, politician, historian.

Background 
François Albert-Buisson was born in 1881 to Pierre Buisson and Marie Boste. A prolific businessperson, his many roles ranged from pharmacist and founder of the pharmaceutical company Theraplix to banker and literary figure. François Albert-Buisson is noted for being the fourteenth member elected to occupy seat two of the Académie Française in 1955.

References

1881 births
1961 deaths
People from Issoire
Radical Party (France) politicians
French Senators of the Third Republic
French economists
Members of the Académie Française
Members of the Académie des sciences morales et politiques
French biographers
Grand Croix of the Légion d'honneur
French military personnel of World War I
French male non-fiction writers
20th-century French historians
Burials at Passy Cemetery
Senators of Puy-de-Dôme
20th-century French male writers